Highway is a 1995 Indian Malayalam-language action thriller film directed by Jayaraaj, produced by Prem Prakash, and written by Sab John. The film stars Suresh Gopi and Bhanupriya with  Vijayaraghavan, Janardhanan and Biju Menon in supporting roles. The film's original songs were composed by S. P. Venkatesh, while cinematography was handled by P. Sukumar.

The film follows Sreedhar Prasad (Gopi), who is a RAW officer assigned with the task of investigating a bomb blast that killed 30 innocent college students. The blast occurs in the outskirts of the city and near a township called Wintergreen. He disguises himself under the codename Mahesh Aravind to bring the people behind the blast to justice.

The film released on 3 May 1995 to positive reviews. The film was a commercial success and ran for 100 days. It went on to become a blockbuster at the box office. The film was an even greater success in Andhra Pradesh, were it created a massive hype even before it was released. It was dubbed into Telugu and was a box office hit in Andhra Pradesh, like the previous Telugu dubbed movies of Suresh Gopi.

Plot

Sreedhar Prasad is a RAW officer assigned with the task of investigating a bomb blast that killed 30 innocent college students. He operates under the name Mahesh Aravind, a planter from Udumbanchola and chooses a township Wintergreen as his temporary residence during the course of the investigation. Meera, a resident of the same township, falls in love with Mahesh and wishes to marry him. Mahesh establishes a friendly relation with the Assi. Commissioner of Police Mr. George Alexander, who was the official in charge of the criminal investigation. As the investigation proceeds, it is understood that the bomb blast was connected with a chain of crimes that happened in the area including the missing of a scientist Guhan Menon from Baddapur space research organization (Who is later revealed to be killed). It is revealed that Shankar Dev Rana, an established businessman and educationist in the common front is actually a traitor and drug lord in his parallel life. The rest of the story revolves around how Sreedhar Prasad and his subordinate Moorthy solves the cases and wins against the "great" Shankar Dev Rana and his gang of "pungis".

Cast
 Suresh Gopi as Sreedhar Prasad IPS/Mahesh Aravind (RAW officer)
 Bhanupriya as Meera
 Vijayaraghavan as Moorthy/Unnithaan (RAW Officer)
 Janardhanan as DYSP George Alexander-Assistant Commissioner of Police
 Biju Menon as SI Pavithran
 Jose Prakash as Kartha (Meera's father)
 Augustine as Sukumaran/Sukhbir (Hanuman) Singh
 Kunchan as Vasco
 Sukumari as Vasco's mother
 Eliyas Babu as Shankar Dev Rana
 Kamal Gaur as Henchman of Shankar Dev Rana
 Spadikam George as IG
 Vineeth as Vinod Menon/Apache (One among the students who gets killed in the blast)
 Prem Prakash as Sivanandan 
 Silk Smitha as Dancer

Music

The soundtrack album was composed by S. P. Venkatesh for the lyrics penned by Gireesh Puthenchery.

Box office
The film was a commercial success in Kerala and also in Andhra Pradesh. According to producer Khader Hassan, it created hype in Andhra Pradesh even before release due to the previous success of Suresh Gopi's dubbed films, and that after the success of Highway, many older Malayalam movies in which Suresh Gopi appeared in supporting roles too were marketed in the Tamil and the Telugu.

Sequel 
A sequel to the film titled Highway 2 has been announced.

References

External links

1990s Malayalam-language films
Films about the Research and Analysis Wing
Indian crime thriller films
1995 films
1995 crime thriller films